The Wye River is a perennial river of the Corangamite catchment, located in the Otways region of the Australian state of Victoria.

Location and features
The Wye River rises in the Otway Ranges in southwest Victoria and flows generally east towards the town of  where the river reaches its mouth and empties into Bass Strait, north of Cape Otway. From its highest point, the river descends  over its  course.

Etymology
The river was named by surveyor George Smythe and is derived from one of the rivers of the same name in the United Kingdom.

See also

References

External links

Corangamite catchment
Rivers of Barwon South West (region)
Otway Ranges